Nemdargunj (pop. 3000) is a village in Nawada district about 6 km from the main town of Nawada. There are several schools operating under the Government of Bihar. The population consists of both Hindus and Muslims.

A small stream passes by the village and is popularly known as part of the Kuri River.

Villages in Nawada district